Rafael Mattos dos Santos, known as Rafael Goiano (born 22 January 1990) is a Brazilian football player who plays for Mafra.

Club career
He made his professional debut in the Campeonato Brasileiro Série B for Boa on 26 September 2012 in a game against Joinville.

References

1990 births
Sportspeople from Goiânia
Living people
Brazilian footballers
Boa Esporte Clube players
Comercial Futebol Clube (Ribeirão Preto) players
Associação Ferroviária de Esportes players
Esporte Clube São José players
C.D. Mafra players
Brazilian expatriate footballers
Expatriate footballers in Portugal
Liga Portugal 2 players
Association football defenders
21st-century Brazilian people